Stacking is a 1987 American drama film directed by Martin Rosen, starring Christine Lahti, Frederic Forrest, Megan Follows, Jason Gedrick, James Gammon, Jacqueline Brookes and Irene Dailey.

Cast
 Christine Lahti as Kathleen Morgan
 Frederic Forrest as Buster McGuire
 Megan Follows as Anna Mae Morgan
 Jason Gedrick as Gary Connaloe
 James Gammon as Clate Connaloe
 Jacqueline Brookes as Mrs. Connaloe
 Irene Dailey as Mrs. McGuire
 Ray Baker as Dan Morgan
 Peter Coyote as Photographer
 Kaiulani Lee as Connie van Buskirk
 Lucy Deakins

Reception
Vincent Canby of The New York Times wrote, ""Stacking" has a lot of pretty Montana scenery and a lot of not-great music on the soundtrack. Yet it has no real drive or personality of its own. It looks like a movie made as a cooperative venture by film students with a fairly fancy budget."

Michael Wilmington of the Los Angeles Times wrote that "At the end, Anna Mae’s progression has a foreordained feel; not really privy to a struggle or a triumph. Yet it’s a decent film with decent intentions and values. Nowadays, that can sometimes be recommendation enough."

Joe Baltake rated the film 2 stars out of 5, calling it "a case of a movie getting longer with each cut."

References

External links
 
 

American drama films
1987 drama films